is a Japanese guitar manufacturer based in Nakatsugawa, Gifu, Japan. Takamine is known for its steel-string acoustic guitars.

The company was founded in 1959, being renamed as "Takamine Gakki Ltd." in 1962. In 1978 they were one of the first companies to introduce acoustic-electric models, where they pioneered the design of the preamplifier-equalizer component. 

The name comes from Mount Takamine located in Nakatsugawa.

History 
While primarily known for acoustic and acoustic-electric guitars, Takamine produced a limited run of high quality solid body electric guitars in the early to mid 1980s. These are the GX100 (Gibson Explorer body style), GX200 (proprietary type body style similar to a Stratocaster, stop tailpiece bridge), GX200-T or TB, (same as GX200 only with a tremolo bridge), GZ300 (proprietary design), and GZ340 (proprietary design). The GX200 and GZ340 contain factory DiMarzio made pickups.

The Takamine EG523SC came with a clear finish Spruce top and flame maple back and sides. On top is a TK-40 pickup with a tuner and equalizer powered by a 9V battery.

In the early 1980s, Martin Guitars issued a letter asserting that the Takamine F-340 and other models featured a logo design that was allegedly nearly identical to their own.  According to Chris F. Martin IV, CEO of CF Martin and Company, in a speech given to the Unofficial Martin Guitar Forum members on 8 August 2005, no lawsuit was ever actually filed, and Takamine did change the appearance of their guitar logo.

Every year since 1987, Takamine has produced a Limited Edition Guitar model, limited to a few hundred guitars for worldwide distribution. These guitars have come with the company's latest pickup-preamplifier combination and decorative inlays, often with motifs based on nature or astronomical phenomena.

Takamine also manufactured flamenco guitar models in the 1980s and 1990s: FG-136S and FGD-136S. The latter had a built in pickup and EQ. The FGD-136S model was famous as it was used by the french Gipsy Kings flamenco group. Both guitars are identical in construction featuring fine grained cedar top and cypress back and sides. 

Takamine manufactured its highest quality and most expensive guitars at its Sakashita factory in Japan.
Since March 2015, Takamine's US-American distributor has been ESP Guitars.

Series

 Classical & Hirade
 G Series
 Legacy Series
 Bass
 Thermal Top
 Pro Series 17
 Signature Series
 Limited Series
 JJ Signature Series

References

Further reading

External links

 

Companies based in Gifu Prefecture
Manufacturing companies established in 1959
Musical instrument manufacturing companies of Japan
Guitar manufacturing companies
Japanese brands
Japanese companies established in 1959